Marco Antonio Navas González (born 21 September 1982) is a Spanish former footballer who played as a right midfielder.

He amassed Segunda División totals of 127 matches and four goals over six seasons, representing five teams. In La Liga, he appeared for Sevilla.

Club career
Navas was born in Los Palacios y Villafranca, Province of Seville. A product of Sevilla FC's youth system, he made his debut for the first team in the 2003–04 season, playing three La Liga matches as a substitute; he played mainly with the reserves during his spell, however.

In the 2005–06 campaign, Navas served a loan stint with another Andalusian side, Polideportivo Ejido (Segunda División), following which he lost all ties with Sevilla and joined neighbours Xerez CD. For 2008–09 he was loaned to Albacete Balompié in the same league, appearing regularly as they barely retained their league status; he was subsequently released by Xerez, moving down to the Segunda División B by joining CD Guadalajara.

Navas continued to alternate between the second and third tiers the following years, with SD Huesca, CD Leganés and Recreativo de Huelva. He spent the vast majority of his only season with the latter club on the sidelines, due to injury.

On 16 August 2013, aged nearly 31, Navas moved abroad for the first time in his career, signing for Bury of the English League Two. He debuted on 3 September against Port Vale in the Football League Trophy, only racking up three appearances before returning home the following 24 January by mutual consent.

Personal life
Navas' younger brother, Jesús, was also a footballer and a midfielder. He too represented, but with great individual and team success, Sevilla, and helped the Spain national team win the 2010 FIFA World Cup and UEFA Euro 2012.

Their family was of Gitano/Romani origin.

References

External links

Official website 

1982 births
Living people
People from Los Palacios y Villafranca
Spanish Romani people
Sportspeople from the Province of Seville
Spanish footballers
Footballers from Andalusia
Romani footballers
Association football midfielders
La Liga players
Segunda División players
Segunda División B players
Tercera División players
Sevilla FC C players
Sevilla Atlético players
Sevilla FC players
Polideportivo Ejido footballers
Xerez CD footballers
Albacete Balompié players
CD Guadalajara (Spain) footballers
SD Huesca footballers
Elche CF players
CD Leganés players
Recreativo de Huelva players
English Football League players
Bury F.C. players
Spanish expatriate footballers
Expatriate footballers in England
Spanish expatriate sportspeople in England